Martine Ek Hagen (born 4 April 1991) is a Norwegian cross-country skier from Ytre Enebakk.

She competed at the FIS Nordic World Ski Championships 2013 in Val di Fiemme, and at the FIS Nordic World Ski Championships 2015 in Falun.

On 4 April 2018, she announced her retirement from cross-country skiing.

Cross-country skiing results
All results are sourced from the International Ski Federation (FIS).

World Championships

World Cup

Season standings

Individual podiums
1 victory – (1 )

Team podiums

 1 victory – (1 ) 
 2 podiums – (2 )

References

External links 
 

1991 births
Living people
Norwegian female cross-country skiers